This is a list of seasons by the Magnolia Hotshots of the Philippine Basketball Association.

Three-conference era

Two-conference era
*one-game playoffs

Three-conference era
*one-game playoffs**team had the twice-to-beat advantage

End-of-season records

Cumulative records

Magnolia Hotshots seasons